Bembicia is a genus of flowering plants belonging to the family Salicaceae. It contains a single species, Bembicia axillaris.

Its native range is Madagascar.

References

Salicaceae
Salicaceae genera
Monotypic Malpighiales genera